Balatonlelle is a resort town located in Hungary on the southern shore of Lake Balaton, about 35 km west of Siófok. It is known for its numerous tourist attractions, some of those being a 3 km long beach, an aqua park, a go-cart course, and an annual wine festival. It is reachable from Budapest by train (approximately 2.5 hours). It is a family-oriented tourist resort during the summer season. Some other attractions also include a public grass beach and bars located around the town. The wine festival is often held in the first week of August.

The settlement is part of the Balatonboglár wine region.

Between 1979 and 1991 Balatonlelle formed a single settlement together with Balatonboglár under the name Boglárlelle.

Sport
Balatonlelle SE, association football team

Gallery

Twin towns — sister cities
Balatonlelle is twinned with:

  Vlăhița, Romania
  Ramstein-Miesenbach, Germany

External links 
 Balatonlfamily-orientated 
 Street map

References 

Populated places in Somogy County